Kellogg is a city in Wabasha County, Minnesota, along the Zumbro River.  The population was 456 at the 2010 census.

History
Kellogg was laid out in 1870, and named for a railroad sign maker. A post office has been in operation at Kellogg since 1872. Kellogg was incorporated in 1877.

Geography

U.S. Route 61 and Minnesota State Highway 42 are two of the main routes in the community.

Demographics

As of 2000 the median income for a household in the city was $37,885, and the median income for a family was $40,515. Males had a median income of $28,125 versus $22,885 for females. The per capita income for the city was $16,216.  About 6.5% of families and 14.0% of the population were below the poverty line, including 18.8% of those under age 18 and 9.5% of those age 65 or over.

2010 census
As of the census of 2010, there were 456 people, 200 households, and 129 families residing in the city. The racial makeup of the city was 99.1% White, 0.7% Asian, and 0.2% from two or more races. Hispanic or Latino of any race were 0.2% of the population.

There were 200 households, of which 28.5% had children under the age of 18 living with them, 50.5% were married couples living together, 8.5% had a female householder with no husband present, 5.5% had a male householder with no wife present, and 35.5% were non-families. 27.0% of all households were made up of individuals, and 14% had someone living alone who was 65 years of age or older. The average household size was 2.28 and the average family size was 2.78.

The median age in the city was 41.5 years. 21.7% of residents were under the age of 18; 5.6% were between the ages of 18 and 24; 28.7% were from 25 to 44; 26.6% were from 45 to 64; and 17.5% were 65 years of age or older. The gender makeup of the city was 49.6% male and 50.4% female.

Economy
The Mississippi River Lock and Dam No. 4 is located near Kellogg.

Residents
Katherine Hancock Goode, state legislator in Illinois

References

External links
Wabasha-Kellogg (Minnesota) Convention and Visitors Bureau

Cities in Minnesota
Cities in Wabasha County, Minnesota
Zumbro River
Rochester metropolitan area, Minnesota